Sheshtanrud-e Pain (also Romanized as Sheştānrūd-e Pā’īn) is a village in Lat Leyl Rural District, Otaqvar District, Langarud County, Gilan Province, Iran. At the 2006 census, its population was 93, in 23 families.

References 

Populated places in Langarud County